Jim Long (born 28 May 1968) is a Canadian darts player who plays in Professional Darts Corporation events.

In 2018, he qualified for the 2019 PDC World Darts Championship as the highest ranked Canadian player on the CDC Championship Circuit.

He played alongside captain Dawson Murschell for Canada in the 2019 PDC World Cup of Darts.

World Championship results

PDC
 2019: Second round (lost to Benito van de Pas 2–3) (sets)

WDF
 2023:

References

External links

1968 births
Living people
Canadian darts players
PDC World Cup of Darts Canadian team
Professional Darts Corporation associate players
Sportspeople from London, Ontario